Tribolodon sachalinensis is a species of fish in the family Cyprinidae.
It is endemic to Japan and Sakhalin.

References

Tribolodon
Fish described in 1889
Taxa named by Alexander Nikolsky